Amewa is a live album by Cecil Taylor recorded at Sweet Basil, New York City, on February 8, 1986, and released on the Sound Hills label. The album features a solo performance by Taylor divided into two sections. Additional tracks from this concert were released on Iwontunwonsi.

Track listing
All compositions by Cecil Taylor.
 "Amewa, Part 1" - 3:19
 "Amewa, Part 2" - 49:24
Recorded at Sweet Basil, New York City, on February 8, 1986

Personnel
Cecil Taylor: piano

References

1995 live albums
Sound Hills Records albums
Cecil Taylor live albums
Solo piano jazz albums